The 2017–18 season was West Ham Uniteds sixth consecutive campaign in the Premier League since being promoted in the 2011–12 season. It was West Ham's 22nd Premier League campaign overall, their 60th top flight appearance in their 123rd year in existence, and their second in the London Stadium. The club were unable to play any games at the stadium until September, allowing for the time to convert it back to a football stadium following the 2017 World Championships in Athletics in August 2017.

Aside of the Premier League, West Ham United took part in the FA Cup and League Cup, entering at the third round in the FA Cup and the second round in the EFL Cup.

On 7 November 2017 David Moyes was appointed manager on a six-month contract. West Ham were eighteenth in the Premier Division at the time on nine points having played eleven games.

Squad

First team squad

Friendlies
West Ham arranged six pre-season friendlies, beginning against Sturm Graz II on 17 July 2017 in Bad Waltersdorf, Austria, before facing fellow London side Fulham on 20 July in Graz. West Ham then travelled to Germany, where they faced Werder Bremen in a two-legged tie over two days for the Betway Cup which they lost, 3–2 on aggregate, followed by a friendly with Altona 93  on 1 August. West Ham then flew to Iceland to take on fellow Premier League side Manchester City in Reykjavík.

In March 2018, with a break in Premier League action due to FA Cup and international games, the club travelled to financially struggling Dagenham & Redbridge for a fundraising game.

Competitions

Overview

Goalscorers
Correct as of match played 13 May 2018

References

West Ham United F.C. seasons
West Ham United
West Ham United
West Ham United